Bonnie Broel is the owner of House of Broel, a retail outlet specializing in bridal and evening wear.

Overview 
Bonnie Broel is president of the House of Broel Foundation, a 501(c)(3) corporation. She is also the former president of the Bridal Marketing Association of America and the St. Charles Ave. Business Association.

Awards 
In 1991, Bonnie was awarded the first international "ROSE" award (Retailer of Style and Excellence Award) at the Dallas Apparel Market. In 1992 she received the Lifetime Achievement Award from Fashion Group International for her contributions to the fashion industry and won an Alpha Award for the best in-store designer.

On October 16, 2011, Broel was honoured as a Louisiana Legend by Sheriff Marlin N. Gusman.

References 

Berteau, Celeste. "Following the Streetcar up St. Charles Avenue" Preservation In Print. April 2011: 18.

External links
 House of Broel website

Living people
American fashion designers
American women fashion designers
Wedding dress designers
Year of birth missing (living people)
21st-century American women